Make America Rock Again was a North American concert tour. The first tour visited 42 cities starting August 4, 2016 and ending October 9, 2016. The second tour took place in August and September 2017.

Background 

The name "Make America Rock Again" makes reference to the "Make America Great Again" slogan. According to their website, the promoters felt that rock has been  an underground genre for the past decade, and that by organizing a tour consisting of bands who had some mainstream success in the 2000s, it would rejuvenate the rock genre.

Artists 

 12 Stones
 Adelitas Way
 Alien Ant Farm
 Crazy Town
 Drowning Pool (select dates only)
 Fuel (select dates only)
 P.O.D. (select dates only)
 Puddle of Mudd (select dates only)
 Saliva
 Saving Abel
 Scott Stapp
 Sick Puppies
 Tantric
 Trapt
 VAST (select dates only)

2016 dates

2017 dates

References

External links 
 

Concert tours of North America
2016 concert tours
2017 concert tours
Trapt concert tours